Starrucca may refer to:

In Pennsylvania:

Starrucca, Pennsylvania, a borough in Wayne County
Starrucca Creek, a tributary of the North Branch Susquehanna River
Starrucca Viaduct, a stone arch bridge that spans Starrucca Creek near Lanesboro